Greatest Hits is an album by American country music singer and songwriter Hank Williams Jr. The Album was issued by MGM Records as number SE 4656. It reached No. 7 on Billboard's chart of Country Albums in 1970.

Track listing

Side one
 It's All Over But the Crying – 2:34
 Cajun Baby – 2:38
 Standing in the Shadows – 3:07
 Homesick – 2:24
 Where Do I Go From Here – 2:21
 Try Try Again – 2:22

Side two
 I'd Rather Be Gone – 2:42
 A Baby Again – 2:49
 Are You Lonely Too – 2:33
 Rock in My Shoe – 2:08
 My Heart Won't Let Me Go – 2:15

External links
 Official website of Hank Williams Jr.

References

1969 greatest hits albums
Hank Williams Jr. compilation albums
MGM Records compilation albums